The 1956 NYU Violets baseball team represented New York University in the 1956 NCAA baseball season. The Violets played their home games at Ohio Field. The team was coached by Bill McCarthy in his 35th year as head coach at NYU.

The Violots won the District II playoff to advance to the College World Series, where they were defeated by the Wyoming Cowboys.

Roster

Schedule

|-
! style="" | Regular Season
|-

|-
! bgcolor="#DDDDFF" width="3%" | #
! bgcolor="#DDDDFF" width="7%" | Date
! bgcolor="#DDDDFF" width="14%" | Opponent
! bgcolor="#DDDDFF" width="25%" | Site/Stadium
! bgcolor="#DDDDFF" width="5%" | Score
! bgcolor="#DDDDFF" width="5%" | Overall Record
! bgcolor="#DDDDFF" width="5%" | Metro Record
|-

|-
! bgcolor="#DDDDFF" width="3%" | #
! bgcolor="#DDDDFF" width="7%" | Date
! bgcolor="#DDDDFF" width="14%" | Opponent
! bgcolor="#DDDDFF" width="25%" | Site/Stadium
! bgcolor="#DDDDFF" width="5%" | Score
! bgcolor="#DDDDFF" width="5%" | Overall Record
! bgcolor="#DDDDFF" width="5%" | Metro Record
|- align="center" bgcolor="#ffcccc"
|  || April 17 || at  || Alley Pond Park • New York, New York || 4–5 || – || –
|-

|-
! bgcolor="#DDDDFF" width="3%" | #
! bgcolor="#DDDDFF" width="7%" | Date
! bgcolor="#DDDDFF" width="14%" | Opponent
! bgcolor="#DDDDFF" width="25%" | Site/Stadium
! bgcolor="#DDDDFF" width="5%" | Score
! bgcolor="#DDDDFF" width="5%" | Overall Record
! bgcolor="#DDDDFF" width="5%" | Metro Record
|- align="center" bgcolor="#ccffcc"
|  || May 15 || St. John's|| Ohio Field • New York, New York || 2–1 || – || –
|-

|-
! style="" | Postseason
|-

|-
! bgcolor="#DDDDFF" width="3%" | #
! bgcolor="#DDDDFF" width="7%" | Date
! bgcolor="#DDDDFF" width="14%" | Opponent
! bgcolor="#DDDDFF" width="25%" | Site/Stadium
! bgcolor="#DDDDFF" width="5%" | Score
! bgcolor="#DDDDFF" width="5%" | Overall Record
! bgcolor="#DDDDFF" width="5%" | Metro Record
|- align="center" bgcolor="#ccffcc"
| 20 || June 1 || vs  || Bicentennial Park • Allentown, Pennsylvania || 15–7 || 15–4–1 || –
|- align="center" bgcolor="#ccffcc"
| 21 || June 2 || vs St. John's || Bicentennial Park • Allentown, Pennsylvania || 6–2 || 16–4–1 || –
|-

|-
! bgcolor="#DDDDFF" width="3%" | #
! bgcolor="#DDDDFF" width="7%" | Date
! bgcolor="#DDDDFF" width="14%" | Opponent
! bgcolor="#DDDDFF" width="25%" | Site/Stadium
! bgcolor="#DDDDFF" width="5%" | Score
! bgcolor="#DDDDFF" width="5%" | Overall Record
! bgcolor="#DDDDFF" width="5%" | Metro Record
|- align="center" bgcolor="#ffcccc"
| 22 || June 9 || vs Arizona || Johnny Rosenblatt Stadium • Omaha, Nebraska || 0–3 || 16–5–1 || –
|- align="center" bgcolor="#ffcccc"
| 23 || June 10 || vs Wyoming || Johnny Rosenblatt Stadium • Omaha, Nebraska || 2–8 || 16–6–1 || –
|-

|-
|

References

NYU Violets baseball seasons
NYU Violets baseball
College World Series seasons
NYU